This is a list of theatre directors, living and dead, who have been active in the 20th and 21st centuries.

Arabic Speaking

Fouad Awad
Mohammed Al Shanfari

Belarusian Speaking 
 Ihnat Bujnicki
 Mikalai Khalezin

Bengali speaking

Montazur Rahman Akbar
Debesh Chattopadhyay
Utpal Dutta
Goutam Halder
Manoj Mitra
Shambhu Mitra
Mamunur Rashid
Badal Sarkar
Bratya Basu

Chinese speaking

Jiao Juyin
Li Liuyi
Wang Chong

English speaking

George Abbott
Maria Aitken
JoAnne Akalaitis
Franco Ambriz
Threes Anna
Libby Appel
Steven Atkinson
Lucy Bailey
Dominic Barber
Neil Bartlett
John Barton
Emjo Basshe
Julian Beck
Paul Berman
David Berthold
Etel Billig
Anne Bogart
Lee Breuer
Mark Brokaw
Peter Brook
Robert Brustein
Hazel Joan Bryant
Betty Burstall
Simon Callow
Annie Castledine
Joseph Chaikin
Rachel Chavkin
Ping Chong
Harold Clurman
Victor Correia
Edward Gordon Craig
James Dacre
Howard Davies
Ian Dickens
Marcia Milgrom Dodge
Declan Donnellan
Mehmet Ergen
Gale Edwards
Tim Etchells
Joel Fink
Richard Foreman
Bob Fosse
Bob Frith
Frank Galati
Patrick Garland
Joel Gersmann
John Gielgud
Katie Mitchell
Andre Gregory
Tyrone Guthrie
Peter Hall
Marcia Haufrecht
Jeremy Herrin
Jack Hofsiss
Michael Howard
Sophie Hunter
John Jesurun
Michael Kahn
Robert Kalfin
Helena Kaut-Howson
Elia Kazan
Patrick Kinmonth
Jim Knipple
Jan Kott
Wayne Lamb
Tina Landau
James Lapine
Charles Laughton
Eddie Lawrence
Walter Learning
Elizabeth LeCompte
Robert Lepage
Robert Lewis
Tom Littler
Clare Lizzimore
Phyllida Lloyd
Joshua Logan
Sidney Lumet
Rosie Malek-Yonan
Judith Malina
Joe Mantello
Kathleen Marshall
Rob Marshall
Jackie Maxwell
Richard Maxwell
Michael Mayer
Brad Mays
Des McAnuff
Simon McBurney
Guthrie McClintic
Sam Mendes
Jorge Merced
Worthington Miner
Neil Munro
Stephen Murphy
Christopher Newton
Mike Nichols
Trevor Nunn
Laurence Olivier
Diane Paulus
Ralph Pena
Robin Phillips
Steven Pimlott
Hal Prince
José Quintero
Agustin Reyes
Lloyd Richards
Martin Ritt
Hannah Ryan
Mark Rylance
Samantha Saltzman
Kate Saxon
Franklin Schaffner
Richard Schechner
Jay Scheib
Peter Schumann
Michael Scott
Peter Sellars
Andrei Şerban
Stephen Shank
Nathaniel Shaw
Hassard Short
Leigh Silverman
Jeanmarie Simpson
Max Stafford-Clark
Susan Stroman
Rebecca Taichman
Julie Taymor
Tazewell Thompson
Sidney Toler
Ilana Ransom Toeplitz
Russell Treyz
Craig Walker
Sam Wanamaker
Matthew Warchus
Douglas Turner Ward
Deborah Warner
David Warren
Orson Welles
James Whale
Bart Whiteman
Kate Whoriskey
Robert Wilson
Lee Wochner
George C. Wolfe
Robert Woodruff
Mary Zimmerman

Filipino speaking 

Daisy Avellana
Lamberto V. Avellana
Joel Lamangan
Menchu Lauchengco-Yulo
Severino Montano
Mario O'Hara
Ralph Pena
Freddie Santos
Rolando Tinio

French speaking 

 Jean Anouilh
 André Antoine
 Antonin Artaud
 Jean Louis Barrault
 Gaston Baty
 Patrice Chéreau
 Jean Cocteau
 Armand Eloi
 Jean Giraudoux
 Louis Jouvet
 Robert Lepage
 Lugné-Poe
 Ariane Mnouchkine
 Jeanne Moreau
 Roger Planchon
 Jacques Rivette
 Jerome Savary
 Stephen Shank
 Jean Vilar

German speaking 

 Ruth Berghaus
 Benno Besson
 Bertolt Brecht
 Hans Bunge
 Frank Castorf
 Dieter Dorn
 Erich Engel
 August Everding
 Walter Felsenstein
 Gotz Friedrich
 Jens-Daniel Herzog
 Leopold Jessner
 Fritz Kortner
 Harry Kupfer
 Thomas Ostermeier
 Martin Kušej (bilingual German/Slovenian)
 Peter Lund
 Erwin Piscator
 Max Reinhardt
 Peter Stein
 Karl Heinz Stroux
 Heinz Tietjen
 Nike Wagner
 Wieland Wagner
 Wolfgang Wagner
 Peter Zadek

Hindi speaking

Ebrahim Alkazi
Shamim Azad
Ram Gopal Bajaj
Manish Joshi Bismil
Satyadev Dubey
Arvind Gaur
Bharatendu Harishchandra
Safdar Hashmi
Rohini Hattangadi
Prithviraj Kapoor
B.V. Karanth
Mohan Maharishi
Prasanna
B.M. Shah
Om Shivpuri
Habib Tanvir
Ratan Thiyam
Bansi Kaul

Italian speaking 

 Giorgio Albertazzi
 Eugenio Barba
 Orazio Costa
 Eduardo De Filippo
 Dario Fo
 Paolo Grassi
 Glauco Mauri 
 Renzo Ricci
 Luca Ronconi
 Guido Salvini
 Maurizio Scaparro
 Luigi Squarzina
 Giorgio Strehler
 Aldo Trionfo
 Luchino Visconti
 Franco Zeffirelli

Lithuanian speaking 

 Dalia Ibelhauptaitė
 Oskaras Koršunovas
 Eimuntas Nekrošius
 Juozas Miltinis
 Rimas Tuminas
 Jonas Vaitkus
 Adolfas Večerskis

Nepali speaking 

 Anup Baral
 Hari Prasad Rimal
 Khagendra Lamichhane
 Sunil Pokharel

Norwegian speaking 

 Tore Vagn Lid
 Stein Winge

Persian speaking 

 Bahram Beyzai
 Hamid Samandarian
 Ali Nassirian

Polish speaking 

Erwin Axer
Richard Boleslavsky
Kazimierz Dejmek
Jerzy Fedorowicz
Jerzy Grotowski
Adam Hanuszkiewicz
Stefan Jaracz
Krzysztof Jasiński
Tadeusz Kantor
Jerzy Markuszewski
Stanisława Perzanowska
Barbara Sass
Leon Schiller
Ludwik Solski
Włodzimierz Staniewski
Józef Szajna
Arnold Szyfman
Mariusz Treliński
Andrzej Wajda
Michał Zadara
Lidia Zamkow
Krzysztof Zanussi
Zbigniew Zapasiewicz
Aleksander Zelwerowicz
Feliks Żukowski

Portuguese speaking 

Augusto Boal
Sergio Britto
Luis Miguel Cintra
João Garcia Miguel
Jorge Listopad
Gerald Thomas

Russian speaking 

Nikolay Akimov
Yevgeny Aryeh 
Vladimir Nemirovich-Danchenko 
Lev Dodin
Anatoly Efros
Kama Ginkas
Yuri Lyubimov
Alexandre Marine
Vsevolod Meyerhold
Vladimir Nemirovich-Danchenko
Nikolai Okhlopkov
Lev Shekhtman
Konstantin Stanislavsky
Alexander Tairov
Georgy Tovstonogov
Yevgeny Vakhtangov
Anatoly Vasiliev
Vladimir Mikhailovich Zakharov
Yury Zavadsky

Serbo-Croatian speaking 

Nebojša Bradić
Goran Gajić 
Branko Gavella
Gradimir Gojer
Zorica Jevremović
Siniša Kovačević
Sulejman Kupusović
Velimir Živojinović Massuka
Dejan Miladinović
Ognjenka Milićević
Branislav Nušić
Vida Ognjenović
Tanja Miletić Oručević
Haris Pašović
Katja Restović
Zijah Sokolović
Mira Trailović
Mirjana Vukomanović
Milenko Zablaćanski
Stevo Žigon

Spanish speaking 

 Calixto Bieito
 Alejandra Boero
 Antonio Cunill Cabanellas
 Orestes Caviglia
 Armando Discépolo
 Nuria Espert
 Carlos Gandolfo
 Victor Garcia
 Juan Carlos Gené
 Antonio Larreta
 Jorge Lavelli
 Inda Ledesma
 Cecilio Madanes
 Jorge Merced
 Fanny Mikey
 José Quintero
 Jesusa Rodríguez
 José Tamayo
 Margarita Xirgu
 China Zorrilla

Slovak speaking 

 Juraj Nvota
 Roman Polák

Swedish speaking 

 Lars Amble
 Ingmar Bergman
 Hugo Hansén
 Olof Molander
 Stig Olin
 Peter Oskarson
 Albert Ranft
 Alf Sjöberg

Multilingual 

Fouad Awad (Arabic, Hebrew, English)
Lucien Bourjeily (Arabic, French, English)
Chandradasan (English, Kannada, Malayalam, Sanskrit, Tamil)
Mario Kovač (Croatian, English, Italian)
Roberto Paci Dalò (English, Italian, German, French, Chinese)
Stephen Shank (English, French)
Mihai Timofti (English, French, Italian, Romanian, Russia)
Rajesh Vedprakash (English, Hindi, Punjabi, Urdu)

Other 

Lilia Abadjieva (Bulgarian)
Kemal Başar (Turkish)
Stancho Stanchev  (Bulgarian)

References

Lists of people by occupation
 
Directors